János Herskó (9 April 1926 – 12 October 2011) was a Hungarian film director and actor. He appeared in 15 films between 1963 and 2006. He also directed nine films between 1948 and 1990. In 1963, he was a member of the jury at the 3rd Moscow International Film Festival.

Selected filmography
 Under the City (1953)
 Iron Flower (1958)
 Second Dance (1983)

References

External links

1926 births
2011 deaths
Hungarian male film actors
Hungarian film directors
Male actors from Budapest
Place of death missing